Confessions of a Sociopath: A Life Spent Hiding in Plain Sight is a 2013 book written by a female law professor under the pen name of M.E. Thomas, describing her up-and-down life as a sociopath. The book describes sociopathy as a disorder that consists of a spectrum of behaviors, rather than the more simplistic stereotype of serial killers. Thomas claims sociopathy helped her be a better lawyer, and in an interview, she suggests that revealing herself in the book helps keep her in check: "Because there's that much pressure and scrutiny, I think I actually will be more successful in continuing to be a good member of society." Lacking her own moral code, she relies on the teachings of her church, The Church of Jesus Christ of Latter-day Saints.

On her agent's advice, Thomas requested a psychological evaluation from John Edens, a psychology professor at Texas A&M University, before submitting her book for publication. After administering multiple tests, Edens concluded that Thomas is indeed a sociopath.

The author later appeared in disguise on Dr. Phil discussing the subject. Business Insider reported that Thomas' book made the idea of a "successful sociopath" mainstream. A review in The New York Times described the book as "intermittingly gripping" and "a revelatory if contradictory muddle of a memoir". Prospero, the books and arts column in The Economist, notes how the writing in the book clearly displays the characteristics of sociopathy: bombast, calculation, deceit, and charm.

Actress Viola Davis said she prepared for her role of Amanda Waller in Suicide Squad by reading Confessions of a Sociopath.

A one-hour dramedy, based on the book, is in development, starring and being co-written by Lisa Edelstein.

See also
 The Mask of Sanity (1941) by Hervey Cleckley
 The Sociopath Next Door (2006) by Martha Stout
 Snakes in Suits (2006) by Paul Babiak and Robert D. Hare

References

2013 non-fiction books
Books about psychopathy
Crown Publishing Group books
Sidgwick & Jackson books